Chikhli is a midsize town in Navsari district in the state of Gujarat, India.

Geography 
It has an average elevation of 19 metres (62 ft).

Chikhli is the smallest city in the region of South Gujarat. About 27 km south east from city of Navsari, 28 km north from the city of Valsad city, and about 10 km east from the city and rail junction of Bilimora. Chikhli is on the Indian National Highway 8, from where state highways reaching Ahwa via Waghai and Vansda, and to the hill station of Saputara bifurcate.

The nearest railway station is Chikhli Road railway station on the Bilimora - Waghai narrow gauge line, about 6 km from Chikhli.

It has a small river i.e. Kaveri.

Climate
Chikhli has a tropical savanna climate (Aw) with little to no rainfall from October to May and extremely heavy rainfall from June to September. The rainfall is much heavier than nearby Valsad due to the orographic lift of the Western Ghats.

Demographics 
As per the 2011 Indian Census, Chikhli had a population of 7025.  Males constitute 51% of the population and females 49%.  Chikhli has an average literacy rate of 84%, higher than the national average of 59.5%; with male literacy of 87% and female literacy of 82%. 9% of the population is under 6 years of age.

Education

Colleges 

 Government BSC Computer Science College
 Shri M.R. Desai Arts and E.E.L.K. Commerce College
 College of Applied Sciences and Professional Studies
 Government Science College, Chikhli
 Tathya Pharmacy College, Chikhli
 Tathya Nursing College, Chikhli

School 
 Fellowship International School (1st English Medium School in Chikhli Taluka) <Best school for academics>
 The D. E. Italia High school, Chikhli
 A.B. School, Chikhli
Shree Swaminarayan International Gunatiti Vidhayadham Chikhli

ITI 
Government ITI

Popular places 
Mallikarjun Temple, An old temple of lord Shiva is situated on the bank of a seasonal lake in a village Majigam (1/2 km from Chikhli). This site is famous for a shooting of a legendary film Mother India starring Sunil Dutt, Raj Kumar and Nargis which was also nominated for Oscars as one of the first Indian movie of Bollywood.

Transportation 
The nearest domestic and international airport is Surat International Airport at Magdalla, Surat, 71 km north from Chikhli city. The other international airport is Chhatrapati Shivaji Maharaj International Airport, 211.7 km south-west from Chikhli city.

References 

Cities and towns in Navsari district